Elisabeth of Leuchtenberg (born: March 1537- died: 6 July 1579 in Dillenburg) was the daughter of Landgrave George III, Landgrave of Leuchtenberg and Margravine Barbara of Brandenburg-Ansbach (1495-1552).

After her death, the German theologian Christoph Pezel wrote an obituary about her.

Portraits 
At least two portraits of Elisabeth of Leuchtenberg exist. The first is in the collection of the Rijksmuseum in the form of an anonymous picture, made between 1850 and 1930, a reproduction of a painting by an unknown painter. The second is a drawing in circular shape.

Another portrait, also made by an anonymous painter, was initially identified as portrait of Charlotte of Bourbon, but it was later identified by L.J. van der Klooster as possibly Elisabeth van Leuchtenberg.

Marriage and issue
Elisabeth was the first wife of John VI of Nassau-Dillenburg, son of William "the Rich" of Nassau en Juliana of Stolberg.  She married on 6 June 1559 at Dillenburg Castle.  They had thirteen children:
 William Louis (1560-1620), stadtholder of Frisia (1584-1620), married Anna of Nassau (1563-1588)
 John VII (1561-1623)
 George (1562-1623)
 Elisabeth (1564-1611), married in 1583 with Philip IV, Count of Nassau-Weilburg and in 1603 with Wolfgang Ernst I of Isenburg-Büdingen-Birstein,
 Juliana (1565-1606)
 Philip (1566-1595)
 Maria (1568-1625), married John Louis I of Nassau-Wiesbaden-Idstein,
 Anna Sibylla (1569-1576), died young
 Mathilda (1570-1625), married Count William V, of Mansfeld-Arnstein
 Albert (1572-1572), died young
 Ernst Casimir (1573-1632), Count of Nassau-Dietz, stadtholder of Frisia and Groningen (1620-1632), married in 1597 with Sophia Hedwig of Brunswick-Lüneburg (1583-1642).  The Dutch Royal Family descends from this marriage.
 Louis Gunther (1575-1604), died in battle at Sluis, married in 1601 Countess Margareta of Manderscheid-Blankenheim (1575–1606)
 stillborn son (1579)

Elisabeth died in 1579.  After her death, John VI had two later marriages, with still more children.

References

German countesses
1537 births
1579 deaths
16th-century German people
House of Leuchtenberg